The 2017–18 Air Force Falcons men's basketball team represented the United States Air Force Academy during the 2017–18 NCAA Division I men's basketball season. The Falcons, led by sixth-year head coach Dave Pilipovich, played their home games at the Clune Arena on the Air Force Academy's main campus in Colorado Springs, Colorado as members of the Mountain West Conference. They finished the season 12–19, 6–12 in Mountain West play to finish in ninth place. They lost in the first round of the Mountain West tournament to UNLV.

Previous season 
The Falcons finished the season 12–21, 4–14 in Mountain West play to finish in a tie for tenth place. They defeated Wyoming in the first round of the Mountain West tournament to advance to the quarterfinals where they lost to Colorado State.

Offseason

Departures

2017 recruiting class

Preseason 
In a vote by conference media at the Mountain West media day, the Falcons were picked to finish in last place in the Mountain West.

Roster

Schedule and results 

|-
!colspan=9 style=| Exhibition

|-
!colspan=9 style=| Non-conference regular season

|-
!colspan=9 style=| Mountain West regular season

|-
!colspan=9 style=| Mountain West tournament 

1 Game originally canceled due to the United States federal government shutdown of 2018. Rescheduled to February 26.

References 

Air Force
Air Force Falcons men's basketball seasons
Air Force Falcons
Air Force Falcons